Montevideo–Chippewa County Airport  is an airport in Montevideo, Minnesota, United States.

References

Airports in Minnesota
Buildings and structures in Chippewa County, Minnesota